Na Bua is a subdistrict in the Nakhon Thai District of Phitsanulok Province, Thailand.

Geography
Na Bua lies in the Nan Basin, which is part of the Chao Phraya Watershed.

Administration
The following is a list of the subdistrict's mubans (villages):

References

Tambon of Phitsanulok province
Populated places in Phitsanulok province